Diego Fernando Salazar Quintero (born 3 October 1980) is a Colombian weightlifter, Olympic medalist and two times gold medal winner at the Pan American Games. He was born in Baranquilla.

Salazar participated in the men's -62 kg class at the 2006 World Weightlifting Championships and won the bronze medal, finishing behind Qiu Le and Oscar Figueroa. He snatched 131 kg and clean and jerked an additional 164 kg for a total of 295 kg, 13 kg behind winner Qiu.

He ranked sixth in the 62 kg category at the 2007 World Weightlifting Championships, lifting a total of 293 kg.

At the 2008 Pan American Weightlifting Championships he won the silver medal in the 62 kg category, lifting 302 kg in total.

2008 Summer Olympics performance

Salazar won a silver medal at the 2008 Summer Olympic Games behind China's Zhan Xiangxiang. Salazar lifted 167 kg and took the silver medal with a total weight of 305 kg.

References

External links
 Athlete Biography SALAZAR Diego at beijing2008

1980 births
Living people
Sportspeople from Valle del Cauca Department
Colombian male weightlifters
Olympic weightlifters of Colombia
Weightlifters at the 2004 Summer Olympics
Weightlifters at the 2008 Summer Olympics
Weightlifters at the 2003 Pan American Games
Weightlifters at the 2007 Pan American Games
Weightlifters at the 2011 Pan American Games
Olympic silver medalists for Colombia
Olympic medalists in weightlifting
Medalists at the 2008 Summer Olympics
Pan American Games gold medalists for Colombia
Pan American Games medalists in weightlifting
Central American and Caribbean Games bronze medalists for Colombia
Competitors at the 2006 Central American and Caribbean Games
South American Games gold medalists for Colombia
South American Games medalists in weightlifting
Competitors at the 2010 South American Games
World Weightlifting Championships medalists
Central American and Caribbean Games medalists in weightlifting
Medalists at the 2007 Pan American Games
Medalists at the 2011 Pan American Games
Pan American Weightlifting Championships medalists
21st-century Colombian people